The Russian Geographical Society Glacier is in east Tajikistan, in the Gorno-Badakhshan Autonomous Province. It is located in the Pamir Mountains, near Independence Peak (formerly Revolution Peak), at approx. .

See also
 List of glaciers

Glaciers of Tajikistan